We Forgot to Break Up is a 2017 Canadian short drama film directed by Chandler Levack. Adapted from the novel Heidegger Stairwell by Kayt Burgess, the film centres on Evan (Jesse Todd), a former rock musician reintroducing himself to his ex-bandmates for the first time since abandoning the band and coming out as a trans man.

The film's cast also includes Cara Gee, Grace Glowicki, Steven McCarthy, Mark Rendall, Dov Tiefenbach and Sofia Banzhaf.

The film premiered at the 2017 Toronto International Film Festival. It won the award for Best Canadian Short Film at the 2017 Whistler Film Festival.

A feature film adaptation of Burgess's novel, to be directed by Karen Knox, entered production in 2022.

References

External links

2017 films
English-language Canadian films
2017 drama films
Canadian LGBT-related short films
2017 LGBT-related films
LGBT-related drama films
Films based on Canadian novels
Films about trans men
2017 short films
2010s English-language films
Canadian drama short films
2010s Canadian films